The Three-detector problem is a problem in traffic flow theory. Given is a homogeneous freeway and the vehicle counts at two detector stations. We seek the vehicle counts at some intermediate location. The method can be applied to incident detection and diagnosis by comparing the observed and predicted data, so a realistic solution to this problem is important. Newell G.F. proposed a simple method to solve this problem. In Newell's method, one gets the cumulative count curve (N-curve) of any intermediate location just by shifting the N-curves of the upstream and downstream detectors. Newell's method was developed before the variational theory of traffic flow was proposed to deal systematically with vehicle counts. This article shows how Newell's method fits in the context of variational theory.

A special case to demonstrate Newell's method 
Assumption. In this special case, we use the Triangular Fundamental Diagram (TFD) with three parameters: free flow speed , wave velocity -w and maximum density  (see Figure 1). Additionally, we will consider a long study period where traffic past upstream detector (U) is unrestricted and traffic past downstream detector (D) is restricted so that waves from both boundaries point into the (t,x) solution space (see Figure 2).

The goal of three-detector problem is calculating the vehicle at a generic point (P) on the "world line" of detector M (See Figure 2). Upstream. Since the upstream state is uncongested, there must be a characteristic with slope  that reaches P from the upstream detector. Such a wave must be emitted  times unit earlier, at point P' on the figure. Since the vehicle number does not change along this characteristic, we see that the vehicle number at the M-detector calculated from conditions upstream is the same as that observed at the upstream detector  time units earlier. Since  is independent of the traffic state (it is a constant), this result is equivalent to shifting the smoothed N-curve of the upstream detector (curve U of Figure 3) to the right by an amount .

Downstream. Likewise, since the state over the downstream detector is queued, there will be a wave reaching P from a location  with wave velocity . The change in vehicular label along this characteristic can be obtained from the moving observer construction of Figure 4, for an observer moving with the wave. In our particular case, the slanted line corresponding to the observer is parallel to the congested part of TFD. This means that the observer flow is independent of the traffic state and takes on the value: . This result is equivalent to shifting the D-curve to the right  units and up  units.

Actual count at M. In view of the Newell-Luke Minimum Principle, we see that the actual count at M should be the lower envelope of the U'- and D'-curves. This is the dark curves, M(t). The intersections of the U'- and D'- curves denote the shock's passages over the detector; i.e., the times when transitions between queued and unqueued states take place as the queue advances and recedes over the middle detector. The area between the U'- and M-curves is the delay experienced upstream of location M, trip times are the horizontal separation between curves U(t), M(t) and D(t), accumulation is given by vertical separations, etc.

Mathematical expression. In terms of the function N(t,x) and the detector location as follows:
 

Basic principles of variational theory (VT) 
Goal. Suppose we know the number of vehicles (N) along a boundary in a time-space region and we are looking for the number of vehicles at a generic point P (denoted as ) beyond that boundary in the direction of increasing time(see Figure 5).

Suppose, again, that an observer starts moving from the boundary to point P along path L. We know the vehicle number the observer sees, . We then break the path of the observer into small sections (such as the one show between A and B) and note that we also know the maximum number of vehicles that can pass the observer along that small section is, . The relative capacity formula tells us that it is: . For TFD and using  for the slope of segment AB,  can be written as:
 
This upper bound applies to any observer that moves with speeds in the range . Thus we can write: 
 
Equations (1) and (2) are based on the relative capacity constraint which itself follows from the conservation law.

Maximum principle. It states that  is the largest possible value, subject to the capacity constraints. Thus the VT recipe is: 
 
It turns out that it produces the same solution as Kinematic wave theory.

Generalized solution
  Three steps:
  1. Find the minimum upstream count, 
  2. Find the minimum downstream count, 
  3. Choose the lower of the two,

Step 1
All possible observer straight lines between the upstream boundary and point P have to be constructed with observer speeds smaller than free flow speed:
 

Thus we need to minimize ; i.e.,

Since , we see that the objective function is non-increasing and therefore .

Thus,

Step 2
We have:
So repeat the same steps we find that  is minimized when . And at point  we get:

Since the FD is triangular, . Therefore, (8) reduces to:

Step 3

This is Newell's the recipe for the 3-detector problem.

See also
Fundamental diagram of traffic flow
Microscopic traffic flow model
Microsimulation
Newell's Car Following Model
Road traffic control
Rule 184
Traffic bottleneck
Traffic counter
Traffic flow
Traffic wave

References 

Road transport
Road traffic management
Transportation engineering